Bonfire of Teenagers is an unreleased studio album by English singer Morrissey. Described by the singer as "the best album of [his] life", Bonfire of Teenagers was produced by Andrew Watt in 2020 and 2021, and features a number of guest appearances from various musicians, such as Iggy Pop, Jesse Tobias, Chad Smith, Flea and Josh Klinghoffer.    

Bonfire of Teenagers was originally announced in May 2021. In October 2022, Bonfire of Teenagers was given a tentative release date of February 2023 in the United States by Capitol Records, but was postponed and later shelved following Morrissey's departure from Capitol in December of that year. In February 2023, Morrissey confirmed that Capitol will not release Bonfire of Teenagers but will still hold onto the rights to it, rendering it an unreleased album.

Background 
In March 2020, Morrissey released his thirteenth studio album I Am Not a Dog on a Chain through BMG Rights Management. Eight months later, he was dropped by BMG following the appointment of a new executive at the label. Morrissey then announced his intention to sell his next completed album to "the highest (or the lowest) bidder". On 29 October 2022, it was announced that Morrissey had signed with Capitol Records in the United States, who set a release date of the album for February 2023, although Morrissey did not sign with a UK label. As part of his deal with the label, Capitol also acquired the rights to reissue his previous solo albums  Southpaw Grammar (1995), You Are the Quarry (2004), Ringleader of the Tormentors (2006), Years of Refusal (2009) and World Peace Is None of Your Business (2014).

Composition 
Bonfire of Teenagers was produced by Andrew Watt and recorded in Los Angeles, California in 2020 and 2021. The album features guest appearances from Iggy Pop, Jesse Tobias, Red Hot Chili Peppers' members Chad Smith and Flea, as well as ex-RHCP guitarist Josh Klinghoffer. 

The album's title track is about the 2017 Manchester Arena bombings, which Morrissey described as "England's 9/11".

Miley Cyrus contributions 
In 2020, American singer Miley Cyrus recorded backing vocals for the song "I Am Veronica". According to Morrissey, Cyrus, a long-time admirer of him and The Smiths, volunteered to provide her vocals for the song, and later offered to appear in a music video for the song. He reflected favourably on his time working with Miley Cyrus, and described "every minute" he spent with her as "loving and funny".

Following his departure from Capitol Records in December 2022, Morrissey reported that Cyrus had requested to have her backing vocals removed from the song. Subsequently, rumours arose that Morrissey's political views were the reason behind Cyrus' decision to remove her vocals from the track; Morrissey denied this, stating that she had "backed off for reasons unconnected to me" due to "a major clash with a key figure in 'the circle' ", although he refused to disclose who it was. He also denied accusations he was far-right, and blamed four anonymous, individual "cancel vultures" with access to "the Legacy Media" for spreading misinformation about him.

Release and promotion 
Bonfire of Teenagers was first announced on 31 May 2021 through Morrissey's website.

Morrissey debuted several new songs from Bonfire of Teenagers live during his tours in 2022, such as "I Am Veronica" in May 2022, and the songs "Rebels Without Applause" "Sure Enough, The Telephone Rings", "I Live in Oblivion", and the title track, which were first performed at Morrissey's Las Vegas concert residency on 1 July 2022. On September 28, 2022, "Kerouac's Crack" was played live for the first and only time. On November 11, 2022, the album's final song, "Saint In A Stained Glass Window", was performed live for the first time at the Toyota Arena in Ontario, California, and at an additional eight shows following its debut.

On 29 October 2022, Morrissey announced that Bonfire of Teenagers had been given a tentative release date of February 2023. However, on 14 November 2022, Morrissey announced that the album had been delayed by Capitol. On 25 November 2022, Morrissey released the first single off the album, "Rebels Without Applause". The single did poorly commercially, which Morrissey blamed on an "absence of any promotion", which he described as "quite sad" and "noticeable".

On 23 December 2022, Morrissey announced that he had "voluntarily parted company" with his management firms, Maverick and Quest, and also "voluntarily withdrawn from any association with Capitol Records". It is unknown whether Bonfire of Teenagers, which Morrissey described as "control[led]" by Capitol, will be released. He also announced that Miley Cyrus wanted her backing vocals taken off from the record.

On 7 February 2023, Morrissey announced that while Universal Music Group (Capitol's parent company) will still control Bonfire of Teenagers, they will not release the album. He also stated that "although he does not believe that Capitol Records in Los Angeles signed ‘Bonfire of Teenagers’ in order to sabotage it, he is quickly coming around to that belief." A week later on 14 February 2023, Morrissey went on to accuse Capitol of promoting "Satanism" with Sam Smith, the latter whom had recently attracted controversy after performing their song "Unholy" with Kim Petras at the BRIT Awards 2023 two days prior.

Track listing

Personnel 
 Morrissey – vocals, lyrics, songwriting

Additional musicians
 Chad Smith  – drums (on "Rebels Without Applause")
 Flea
 Josh Klinghoffer – guitar, percussion, keys (on "Rebels Without Applause")
 Iggy Pop (on "Ha Ha Harlem")
 Jesse Tobias
 Miley Cyrus – backing vocals (on "I Am Veronica")
 Boz Boorer – songwriting (on "Rebels Without Applause")

Production
 Andrew Watt – producer, songwriting

References 

Capitol Records albums
Morrissey albums
Unreleased albums
Albums produced by Andrew Watt (record producer)